PRTG (Paessler Router Traffic Grapher until version 7) is an agentless network monitoring software from Paessler AG. Several software versions are combined under the umbrella term Paessler PRTG. It can monitor and classify system conditions like bandwidth usage or uptime and collect statistics from miscellaneous hosts as switches, routers, servers and other devices and applications.

The first version of PRTG was released on 29 May 2003 by the German company Paessler GmbH (now: Paessler AG), which was founded by Dirk Paessler in 2001.

Products of the Paessler PRTG family 
The monitoring software Paessler PRTG is available in three versions. In addition to the classic standalone solution PRTG Network Monitor, Paessler sells PRTG Enterprise Monitor for large and distributed networks and PRTG Hosted Monitor as a SaaS-version.

PRTG Network Monitor 
PRTG Network Monitor is the classic on-premises monitoring solution, which is hosted on a server in the user's network. For the installation of the core server, a computer with the Windows Server operating system is required.

PRTG Enterprise Monitor 
Since 2020, Paessler has offered PRTG Enterprise Monitor, a specialized monitoring solution for large IT environments. In addition to a particularly high performance for distributed locations, PRTG Enterprise Monitor also includes the ITOps Board, which provides a centralized service-oriented overview. It can be used to map business processes, consolidate dashboards from multiple servers, and monitor SLA performance and availability, among other features.

PRTG Hosted Monitor 
In 2017, a cloud-hosted version of PRTG was released. PRTG Hosted Monitor offers largely the same range of functions as the standard tool. The license is billed monthly and is based solely on the number of sensors. In contrast to PRTG Network Monitor and PRTG Enterprise Monitor, PRTG Hosted Monitor can also be used in networks without a Windows server, since it is hosted in the cloud and not locally.

Specifications 
Paessler PRTG has an auto-discovery mode that scans predefined areas of an enterprise network and creates a device list from this data. In the next step, further information on the detected devices can be retrieved using various communication protocols. Typical protocols are ICMP, SNMP, WMI, NetFlow, jFlow, sFlow, but also communication via DCOM or the RESTful API is possible.

Sensors 
The software is based on sensors that are configured for a specific purpose. A PRTG sensor is a single metric on a device. For instance, when managing a switch, a sensor could be measuring network health, or whether the switch's CPU utilization is running above 90%. Most devices require between five and ten sensors to be fully monitored. There are HTTP, SMTP/POP3 (e-mail) application sensors and hardware-specific sensors for switches, routers and servers. PRTG Network Monitor has over 200 different predefined sensors that retrieve statistics from the monitored instances, e.g. response times, processor, memory, database information, temperature or system status.

Web interface and desktop client 
The software can be operated completely via an AJAX-based web interface. The web interface is suitable for both real-time troubleshooting and data exchange with non-technical staff via maps (dashboards) and user-defined reports. An additional administration interface in the form of a desktop application for Windows, Linux and macOS is available.

Notifications and reports 
In addition to the usual communication channels such as Email and SMS, notification is also provided via push notification on smartphones using an app for iOS or Android. Paessler PRTG also offers customizable reports.

Pricing 
Paessler PRTG's licensing is based on sensors. A version with 100 integrated sensors is available free of charge for PRTG Network Monitor.

See also 

 Comparison of network monitoring systems

References

External links 

 Official website

Literature 

 Andrés, Steven, Brian Kenyon, and Erik Pack Birkholz. Security Sage's guide to hardening the network infrastructure. Elsevier, 2004.
Elsayed, Abdellatief, and Nashwa Abdelbaki. "Performance evaluation and comparison of the top market virtualization hypervisors." Computer Engineering & Systems (ICCES), 2013 8th International Conference on. IEEE, 2013.

System administration
Network management
Port scanners
Network analyzers
Windows software